I've Got to Sing a Torch Song is a 1933 Warner Bros. Merrie Melodies animated short film, directed by Tom Palmer. The short was released on September 23, 1933.

The animation was supervised by Jack King and produced by Leon Schlesinger. The musical score was composed by Bernard B. Brown and Norman Spencer. It premiered with I Loved a Woman in theaters.

The cartoon features the song, "I've Got To Sing A Torch Song," written by Harry Warren and Al Dubin. "I've Got To Sing A Torch Song" had been recorded by many artists, including Bing Crosby, Rudy Vallée, and Al Bowlly.

Dick Powell sang the song "Gold Diggers of 1933" in the film.

Plot

The cartoon is a series of gags featuring characters all singing and dancing to the song "I've Got to Sing a Torch Song" and/or reacting to radio broadcasts. Some scenes are set in stereotypical portrayals of China, Africa, the Arctic, the Middle East and New York City. Some characters are caricatures of celebrities of the 1930s, including: Benito Mussolini, George Bernard Shaw, Leopold Stokowski, Ed Wynn (doing a running gag with 8:00AM), Bing Crosby (identified as Cros Bingsby on the door of his office), James Cagney and Joan Blondell, Ben Bernie, Guy Kibbee, Wheeler and Woolsey, the Boswell Sisters, Greta Garbo, Zasu Pitts and Mae West. In one gag, a sultan is shown listening to the Amos 'n' Andy radio show. Another gag features the Statue of Liberty singing the title track, while ending with the line "Ha-cha-cha-cha-cha-cha", in reference to Jimmy Durante. Garbo, Pitts, and West then play a short tune from The Girl I Left Behind Me. Then Ed Wynn returns to the microphone for one more running gag with a cannon, but it misfires and sends him flying back into his home through the sunroof and landing on a bed with a wife and children who are all wearing firemen's hats; they utter the catch phrase, "Sooo...", with Ed Wynn chortling as the sequence ends.

Garbo concludes the cartoon by saying That's all, folks!.

Sources

External links 
 

1933 films
1933 animated films
American black-and-white films
Animation based on real people
Cultural depictions of Bing Crosby
Cultural depictions of Benito Mussolini
Cultural depictions of Greta Garbo
Cultural depictions of George Bernard Shaw
Cultural depictions of Mae West
Cultural depictions of James Cagney
Cultural depictions of Jimmy Durante
Films about radio
Films scored by Bernard B. Brown
Films scored by Norman Spencer (composer)
Films directed by Tom Palmer (animator)
Films set in Africa
Films set in the Arctic
Films set in China
Films set in the Middle East
Films set in New York City
Merrie Melodies short films
Warner Bros. Cartoons animated short films
1930s Warner Bros. animated short films